Immer in Bewegung (English: Constantly Moving) is the fourth studio album by German band Revolverheld. Released by Sony BMG on 20 September 2013 in German-speaking Europe, it peaked at number nine on the German Albums Chart and was eventually certified triple gold by the Bundesverband Musikindustrie (BVMI), becoming their biggest-selling album yet. Immer in Bewegung also reached number three on the Austrian Albums Chart and produced three top ten singles.

Track listing
All song written by Johannes Strate, Niels Grötsch, Kristoffer Hünecke, and Jakob Sinn.

Charts

Weekly charts

Year-end charts

Certifications

References 

2013 albums
German-language albums
Revolverheld albums